Last Time Around is the third and final studio album by the Canadian-American folk rock band Buffalo Springfield, released in July 1968. The line-up at the time officially consisted of Neil Young, Stephen Stills, Richie Furay, Dewey Martin, Bruce Palmer, and Jim Messina, though the band itself was essentially broken up and the album was put together from previous recordings, some made up to a year earlier.  Jim Messina acted as the album producer and mixing engineer, with input from Furay, as the two compiled the record to fulfil the band's last contractual obligation to its label.  A number of guest musicians (some uncredited) appeared on the album, notably pedal steel guitar player Rusty Young.  

By the time this album was released, the members were already involved in their next projects: Richie Furay, Jim Messina, and Rusty Young were busy forming the country-rock band Poco, Stephen Stills was forming Crosby, Stills & Nash, and Neil Young was performing with a group known as The Rockets which would later become the band Crazy Horse.  Dewey Martin tried to revive the Buffalo Springfield name with new musicians, but he was sued by Stills and Young to prevent him from doing so.  Bruce Palmer briefly joined Crosby, Stills & Nash, but legal problems kept him from producing much musical output during the rest of the 1960s.

History 
Last Time Around was released to fulfill contractual commitments. By the time it was completed the group had functionally disbanded, with the cover photo of the group consisting of a montage and the five original members only recording together on one track, "On the Way Home".

Original bassist Bruce Palmer only appears on "On the Way Home". His face is shown on the back cover photo montage with a humorous, partially obscured, "mad" sign aligned, due to Palmer resembling Alfred E. Neuman in the shot.

The lyrics to "The Hour of Not Quite Rain" were the result of an August 1967 contest run by Los Angeles radio station KHJ. Entrants would write a poem to be set to music and recorded by the Buffalo Springfield. The prize was $1000 plus publishing royalties. The winning entry was written by Micki Callen.

The album contained songs that were very important to the authors. Neil Young has performed both "I Am a Child" and "On the Way Home" in concert throughout his career, the latter both solo and with CSNY, the Transband and the Bluenotes. "Kind Woman" became one of Richie Furay's best known songs; he performed it with Poco and throughout his solo career. Stephen Stills merged "Questions" with a new song, "Carry On", which became the opening track on Déjà Vu and was a major part of Crosby, Stills, Nash & Young's concert repertoire.

Critical reception 

Barry Gifford of Rolling Stone, called Last Time Around Buffalo Springfield's "most beautiful record" and "a final testament to their multi-talent". Robert Christgau, writing for Esquire, called it a "beautiful farewell album" of "countrified music", in which "country elements are incorporated into a total style". Richie Unterberger was less enthusiastic in a retrospective review for AllMusic. He found Young's songs for the album "outstanding", but believed Stills' songwriting was a decline from the group's previous albums.
It was voted number 505 in the third edition of Colin Larkin's All Time Top 1000 Albums (2000).

Track listing

Side one
"On the Way Home" (Young) – 2:25
 Recorded November 15-December 13, 1967, Sunset Sound, Los Angeles, California. Vocals: Richie Furay, Neil Young; bass: Bruce Palmer; piano: Neil Young. 
"It's So Hard to Wait" (Furay, Young) – 2:03
 Recorded March 9, 1968, Sunset Sound, Los Angeles, California.  Lead vocals: Richie Furay.
"Pretty Girl Why" (Stills) – 2:24
 Recorded February 26 & May 1967, Sound Recorders, Hollywood and Atlantic Studios, New York City.  Lead vocals: Stephen Stills; bass: Jim Fielder. 
"Four Days Gone" (Stills) – 2:53
 Recorded late 1967-early 1968.  Lead vocals and piano: Stephen Stills"Carefree Country Day" (Messina) – 2:35
 Recorded late 1967-early 1968. Lead vocals: Jim Messina."Special Care" (Stills) – 3:30
 Recorded January 3–20, 1968. Sunset Sound, Hollywood. Lead vocals, pianos, B3, guitars, bass: Stephen Stills; drums: Buddy Miles.Side two
"The Hour of Not Quite Rain" (Micki Callen, Furay) – 3:45
 Recorded late 1967-February 1968. Lead vocals: Richie Furay."Questions" (Stills) – 2:52
 Recorded February 16, 1968, Sunset Sound, Los Angeles, California. Vocals, guitars, bass guitar, Hohner clavinet: Stephen Stills; drums: Jimmy Karstein."I Am a Child" (Young) – 2:15
 Recorded February 5, 1968, Sunset Sound, Los Angeles, California. Lead vocals: Neil Young; bass: Gary Marker."Merry-Go-Round" (Furay) – 2:02
 Recorded February 16-March 1968, Sunset Sound, Los Angeles, California.  Lead vocals: Richie Furay; bass: drums: Jimmy Karstein. Harpsichord, calliope, bells: Jeremy Stuart."Uno Mundo" (Stills) – 2:00
 Recorded February–March 1968, Sunset Sound, Los Angeles, California.  Lead vocals: Stephen Stills."Kind Woman" (Furay) – 4:10
 Recorded February–March 6, 1968, Atlantic Studios, New York City & Sunset Sound, Los Angeles, California. Lead vocals: Richie Furay; pedal steel guitar: Rusty Young; bass: Richard Davis (not Dickie Davis).''

Personnel
Buffalo Springfield
Richie Furay - guitar (1,2,3,8,10,11,12), vocals (1,2,3,5,7,10,12)
Dewey Martin - drums (1,2,3,9,11)
Jim Messina - bass, vocals (5,12)
Stephen Stills - guitar (1,2,3,4,6,8,10,11), piano (4,6,8), B3 organ (6,8,11), bass (6,8), clavinet  (8), vibes (1), percussion (11), Handclaps (11), background vocal (1,5,8,10), lead vocal (3,4,6,8,11)
Neil Young - guitar (3,9,10), harmonica (9), piano (1), background vocal (1), lead vocal (9)
Bruce Palmer - bass (1)
Additional personnel
Jim Fielder - bass (3)
Buddy Miles - drums (6)
Jimmy Karstein - drums (8,10)
Gary Marker : bass (9)
Jeremy Stuart - harpsichord, calliope, bells (10)
Rusty Young - pedal steel guitar (12)
Richard Davis - bass (12)
unidentified - horns (1), saxophone, clarinet (2), drums (4), bass, drums, harpsichord, orchestra (7), horn (11), piano, drums (12)

Track numbers refer to CD and digital releases of the album.

Production
Producer: Jim Messina
Engineers: Adrian Barber, Phil Iehle, Jim Messina

Charts

References

Buffalo Springfield albums
1968 albums
Atco Records albums
Albums produced by Jim Messina (musician)
Albums recorded at Sunset Sound Recorders